The SET Index is a Thai composite stock market index calculated by the prices of all common stocks (including unit trusts of property funds) on the main board of the Stock Exchange of Thailand (SET), except for stocks that have been suspended for more than one year. It is a market capitalization-weighted price index which compares the current market value of all listed common shares with its value on the base date of April 30, 1975, when the Index was established and set at 100 points.

The formula of calculation is as follows:

SET Index = ( Current Market Value x 100 ) / Base Market Value

The SET Index calculation is adjusted in line with modifications in the values of stocks resulting from changes in the number of stocks due to various events, e.g., public offerings, exercised warrants, or conversions of preferred to common shares, in order to eliminate all effects other than price movements from the index.

Besides the SET Index, which is calculated from the stock prices of all common stocks listed on The SET, The SET also provides other indices to investors that include the:

Market for Alternative Investment (MAI) Index
Industry Group and Sectoral Indices
SET50 Index and SET100 Index

Annual Returns 
The following table shows the annual development of the SET Index since 1975.

Components 
Foods
 Charoen Pokphand Foods
 Khon Kaen Sugar
 Minor International
 Thai President Foods
 Thai Union

Automotive
 Thai Rung Union Car

Consumer electronics
 I-Mobile

Communications
 Advanced Info Service
 DTAC
 Intouch Holdings
 Thaicom
 True Corporation

Construction material
 Siam Cement
 TPI Polene

Chemicals
 Indorama Ventures
 IRPC
 PTT Global Chemical

Oil & gas
 PTT Exploration and Production
 PTT Public Company Limited
 Thai Oil

Electric power
 Glow Energy

Steel products
 Sahaviriya Steel Industries

Aviation
 Bangkok Airways
 Nok Air
 Thai AirAsia
 Thai Airways

Construction
 Christiani & Nielsen
 International Engineering Public Company Limited

Resources
 Banpu
 Thai Rubber Latex Corporation
 Thai Tap Water SupplyBanking
 Bangkok Bank
 Bank of Ayudhya
 Kasikornbank
 Kiatnakin Bank
 Krung Thai Bank
 Siam Commercial Bank
 Thanachart Bank
 Tisco Bank
 TMB Bank

Insurance
 Bangkok Insurance

Real estate
 Areeya Property
 Bangkok Land
 Land and Houses
 Pace Development
 Pruksa Real Estate
 Raimon Land
 Sansiri

Retail
 Central Pattana
 Major Cineplex
 MBK Center
 Robinson Department Store
 Siam Makro
 The Erawan Group

Health care
 Bangkok Dusit Medical Services
 Bumrungrad International Hospital

Commerce
 Berli Jucker
 CP All

Media
 BEC-TERO
 GMM Grammy
 Nation Multimedia Group
 RS Public Company Limited
 Workpoint Entertainment

Transportation
 BTS Group Holdings

Services
 AsiaSoft

References

External links
Bloomberg page for SET:IND

Stock Exchange of Thailand
Thai stock market indices
1975 establishments in Thailand